Triadic may refer to:

 Triad (music)
 Triadic patent, a series of corresponding patents
 Triadic reciprocal causation, a concept in social psychology
 Triadic relation, a mathematical concept
 p-adic number, where p=3, a mathematical concept
Triadic System in Psychiatry

See also
 Tertian